Leaders Not Followers: Part 2 is a cover album by British grindcore band Napalm Death, released in 2004 by Century Media. It contains covers of various hardcore punk and heavy metal songs. Although Jesse Pintado is credited for playing guitars, guitarist Mitch Harris revealed in an interview with The Metal Forge in 2005 that Pintado did not contribute to Leaders Not Followers: Part 2.

Release
Leaders Not Followers: Part 2 marked the band's debut for German heavy metal record label Century Media. The CD version contains a live video clip of the Cryptic Slaughter song Lowlife.

Reception

Damien of Terrorizer described the album as featuring "essentially a 'Who's Who' of extreme music in the 80s", with "Napalm [Death] not only highlight[ing] the links between disparate strains (punk, hardcore, crossover, thrash) but provid[ing] a damned enjoyable 43-minute hellride". Amy Sciarretto of CMJ New Music Report called the album "noisy, loud, brash and fast, just like the originals and just the way we like Napalm Death."

Track listing

Personnel

Napalm Death
 Mark "Barney" Greenway – lead vocals
 Jesse Pintado – lead guitar
 Mitch Harris – rhythm guitar, backing vocals
 Shane Embury – bass
 Danny Herrera – drums

Additional musicians
 Jim Whiteley – bass (7, 12)

Technical personnel
 Russ Russell – production
 Simon Efemey – engineering
 Mid – artwork
 Mick Kenney – layout, design

References

Napalm Death albums
Century Media Records albums
2004 albums